The Judiciary of Mexico is one of the three branches of government in Mexico . It is made up of the Supreme Court of Justice of the Nation, the Electoral Court of the Federal Judicial Branch, the Federal Judicial Council, the District Courts, the Collegiate Circuit Courts and the Unitary Circuit Courts. Its foundations are found in Title III, Chapter IV (covering fourteen articles) of the Constitution of Mexico and the Organic Law of the Judicial Power of the Federation. The Federal Jury of Citizens and the courts of the States and of Mexico City, may act to the aid of the Federal Justice, in the cases provided by the Constitution and the laws . The administration, surveillance and discipline of the Federal Judicial Branch, with the exception of the Supreme Court of Justice and the Electoral Court, is in charge of the Federal Judicial Council. That power, and its set of organs, can determine justice in all institutional aspects of the Mexican state; the application of legal norms and principles in conflict resolution; and in all areas of law enforcement and the interpretation of laws in society (civil, criminal, constitutional, commercial, labor, administrative, fiscal, judicial, etc.)

References

 
Law of Mexico
Government in Central America